Airtime is a group video, audio and text chat app available on iOS, Android, and Desktop. Users have the ability to communicate with voice calls, video calls, text messaging, media and files in public or private group chats called "rooms". It originally launched to the public as a web product on June 5, 2012. It relaunched in April 2016.

Overview
Airtime is a joint digital media venture between Sean Parker and Shawn Fanning that launched in June 2012.

History
Airtime.com went live for general use on June 5, 2012. The site was launched after a press conference in New York City, which featured a number of major celebrities Snoop Dogg, Olivia Munn and Martha Stewart. , the site appeared to have few active users.

Airtime relaunched in 2016 as a mobile-first experience for iOS and Android.

References

External links

 Airtime.com (official website)

Chat websites
English-language websites
Internet properties established in 2012
Video hosting
Social networking websites
American companies established in 2012